Maria Kobylińska (born 2 February 1960) is a Polish rower. She competed in the women's quadruple sculls event at the 1980 Summer Olympics.

References

1960 births
Living people
Polish female rowers
Olympic rowers of Poland
Rowers at the 1980 Summer Olympics
Rowers from Warsaw